Tahiti is an island in French Polynesia.

Tahiti may also refer to:

Arts and entertainment
Tahiti (band), a South Korean girl group
"T.A.H.I.T.I.", an episode of Agents of S.H.I.E.L.D.
Tahiti, an American pop duo bst known for singing insert songs for The Real Ghostbusters animated series
"Tahiti", song by Jim Reeves from his album The International Jim Reeves 1963
Tahiti Bob and Tahiti Mel are used in French dubbing version of The Simpsons for Sideshow Bob and Sideshow Mel respectively

Other
Île Sans Nom, France which is also known as Tahiti
RMS Tahiti, a 1904 ocean liner
 The code name of the AMD Radeon GPU series chip Radeon HD 7900

See also
 Tahitian (disambiguation)